Pedro Gianella (born 3 October 1932) is a Peruvian former sports shooter. He competed in the skeet event at the 1968 Summer Olympics.

References

1932 births
Living people
Peruvian male sport shooters
Olympic shooters of Peru
Shooters at the 1968 Summer Olympics
20th-century Peruvian people